Kayla MacMillan (born May 10, 1998, in Belleville, Ontario) is a Canadian curler from New Westminster, British Columbia. She currently plays third on Team Clancy Grandy.

Career
While playing juniors in Ontario, MacMillan skipped her team of Sarah Daviau, Lindsay Dubue and Marcia Richardson to a gold medal at the 2015 Optimist Under 18 Women's Championship. After a 5–0 record through the round robin, the team beat Japan 6–2 in the semifinal and defeated Alberta 4–1 in the championship game. The following season, the team competed in the east qualifier for the 2016 Ontario Scotties Tournament of Hearts but were unable to qualify for the provincial championship. For the 2016–17 season, MacMillan joined the Chelsea Brandwood rink at lead. The team competed in the 2017 Ontario U-21 Curling Championships, where they went 4–3 through the round robin. This qualified them for a tiebreaker, which they lost 7–5 to Courtney Auld.

For her final two years of junior eligibility, MacMillan moved to British Columbia and joined the Sarah Daniels' Delta based rink. The team, including second Megan Daniels and lead Sarah Loken had a successful tour season, reaching the semifinals of the Royal LePage Women's Fall Classic and the quarterfinals of the Driving Force Abbotsford Cashspiel. On the junior tour, they won the Parksville BC Junior Women's event. The team entered the BC provincial junior championship as one of the top seeds and finished first after the round robin with a 6–1 record. They then defeated Emily Bowles 11–5 in the 1 vs. 2 game to qualify for the provincial final. There, they lost 6–5 to Taylor Reese-Hansen in an extra end.

Megan Daniels aged out of juniors following the season and the team added Jessica Humphries at second. On the bonspiel circuit, they wouldn't find as much success, only reaching the playoffs once at the Challenge de Curling de Gatineau open event. They were, however, able to capture the BC junior provincial title, defeating Team Reese-Hansen 10–4 in the provincial final. This qualified them for the 2019 Canadian Junior Curling Championships where they finished 5–1 through the round robin. With a 2–2 record through the championship pool, the team was tied for third for Quebec's Laurie St-Georges, who they then beat 8–6 in the tiebreaker to qualify for the playoffs. After defeating Nova Scotia's Kaitlyn Jones 9–7 in the semifinal, they lost a tight 9–6 final to Alberta's Selena Sturmay, settling for silver. Also during the 2018–19 season, MacMillan skipped the Douglas Royals to a gold medal at the CCAA/Curling Canada College Curling Championships, defeating MacEwan University 7–5 in the final.

Out of juniors, Team Daniels remained intact for the 2019–20 season. On tour, the team reached the final of the King Cash Spiel but missed the playoffs in their other four events. They were able to qualify for the 2020 British Columbia Scotties Tournament of Hearts through the second open qualifier, winning 10–4 over Lindsay Hudyma. The team had a good showing at the provincial playdown, finishing 4–3 through the round robin and qualifying for the playoffs. They then beat Brette Richards 10–5 in the semifinal before losing 11–5 to Corryn Brown in the semifinal. Also this season, MacMillan defended her title at the Curling Canada College Curling Championships, winning 10–1 over Humber College in the final.

After taking a season off, MacMillan formed her own team of Jody Maskiewich, Lindsay Dubue and Sarah Loken for the 2021–22 season. On the tour, the team reached the final of the DeKalb Superspiel where they lost to Amber Holland. At the 2022 British Columbia Scotties Tournament of Hearts, the team qualified for the playoffs through the A Event, defeating defending champions Corryn Brown in the process. They then beat Mary-Anne Arsenault in the 1 vs. 2 game but lost to them in the provincial final 8–6, finishing in second place. They ended the season at the Best of the West event where they reached the semifinals.

For the 2022–23 season, the team added Clancy Grandy as their new skip, shifting MacMillan to third. In their first event, they finished runner-up to Silvana Tirinzoni at the Summer Series.

Personal life
MacMillan is currently a neuromechanical physiology student at the University of British Columbia. She previously attended Douglas College. She also works as an athletic trainer at Rebound Sport and Spine and is a CrossFit coach at CrossFit New West.

Teams

References

External links

1998 births
Canadian women curlers
Living people
Curlers from Ontario
Curlers from British Columbia
20th-century Canadian women
21st-century Canadian women
University of British Columbia alumni
Sportspeople from Belleville, Ontario
Sportspeople from New Westminster